Events in the year 1706 in Spain.

Incumbents
Monarch: Philip V

Events
April 3–27 - Siege of Barcelona
April - Siege of Alcantara

References

 
1700s in Spain